The 1981–82 season was Colchester United's 40th season in their history and first season back in fourth tier of English football, the Fourth Division following relegation the previous campaign. Alongside competing in the Fourth Division, the club also participated in the FA Cup and the League Cup.

Colchester mounted a serious promotion challenge for much of the season, but a downturn in form in the second half of the season led to Bobby Roberts losing his job as manager, with Allan Hunter recruited to replace him in May when the U's promotion hopes were over for the season. They exited both cups in the third round, although they took Second Division Newcastle United to a thrilling extra time finale at Layer Road where the hosts were eventually defeated 4–3.

Season overview
After the board had decided to keep the faith in Bobby Roberts for the new season despite relegation, the introduction of the three-points for a win format for this year helped Colchester hit the top of the league by November 1981, scoring an impressive 41 goals. The U's also reached the third round of the FA Cup, taking Newcastle United to a replay before losing 4–3 following extra time at Layer Road.

A £25,000 outlay brought forward John Lyons to Layer Road who promptly scored on his debut as Colchester thrashed promotion rivals Sheffield United 5–2 in front of the Match of the Day cameras. However, a host of injuries and suspensions in the latter stages of the season saw Colchester drop down the table, and as such the board requested Roberts resign in April. He refused to do so and was sacked a month later. Former player Ray Bunkell filled the brief void before Allan Hunter was brought in as his replacement, tasked with his first managerial role.

Colchester had gone from promotion favourites to sixth, 16 points off the promotion places, despite a prolific strike force in Ian Allinson, who scored 26 goals, and Kevin Bremner, who scored 24 goals.

Players

Transfers

In

 Total spending:  ~ £25,000

Out

 Total incoming:  ~ £0

Match details

Fourth Division

Results round by round

League table

Matches

League Cup

FA Cup

Squad statistics

Appearances and goals

|-
!colspan="14"|Players who appeared for Colchester who left during the season

|}

Goalscorers

Disciplinary record

Clean sheets
Number of games goalkeepers kept a clean sheet.

Player debuts
Players making their first-team Colchester United debut in a fully competitive match.

See also
List of Colchester United F.C. seasons

References

General
Books

Websites

Specific

1981-82
English football clubs 1981–82 season